Oleg Sergeyevich Kulkov (born March 6, 1978, in Verkhnyaya Pyshma) is a Russian marathon runner.

Biography
He won the Zurich Marathon in 2008, recording a personal best time of 2:11:15. This qualified him to represent Russia at the 2008 Summer Olympics and he finished 29th overall in the marathon at the 2008 Beijing Games. He improved his best to 2:10:13 with a second-place finish in Zurich and went on to take 20th place at the 2009 World Championships in Athletics. The following year he fifteenth in the European Marathon Championship race.

He equalled his personal best time at the 2011 Seoul International Marathon, taking third place behind Abderrahim Goumri and Jeong Jin-Hyeong. That October he ran another race in Korea, the Gyeongju International Marathon, and finished in fifth place.

References

External links 
 

1978 births
Living people
Russian male long-distance runners
Russian male marathon runners
People from Verkhnyaya Pyshma
Athletes (track and field) at the 2008 Summer Olympics
Olympic athletes of Russia
Sportspeople from Sverdlovsk Oblast